Year 1000 (M) was a leap year starting on Monday (link will display the full calendar) of the Julian calendar. In the proleptic Gregorian calendar, it was a non-leap century year starting on Wednesday (like 1800). It was also the last year of the 10th century as well as the last year of the 1st millennium of the Christian Era ending on December 31, but the first year of the 1000s decade.

The year falls well into the period of Old World history known as the Middle Ages; in Europe, it is sometimes and by convention considered the boundary date between the Early Middle Ages and the High Middle Ages.
The Muslim world was in its Golden Age. 
China was in its Song dynasty, Korea was in its Goryeo dynasty, Japan was in its classical Heian period.
India was divided into a number of lesser empires, such as the Chalukya Empire, Pala Empire (Kamboja Pala dynasty; Mahipala), Chola dynasty (Raja Raja Chola I), Yadava dynasty, etc.
Sub-Saharan Africa was still in the prehistoric period, although trans Saharan slave trade was beginning to be an important factor in the formation of the Sahelian kingdoms.
The pre-Columbian New World was in a time of general transition in many regions. Wari and Tiwanaku cultures receded in power and influence while Chachapoya and Chimú cultures rose toward florescence in South America.  In Mesoamerica, the Maya Terminal Classic period saw the decline of many grand polities of the Petén like Palenque and Tikal yet a renewed vigor and greater construction phases of sites in the Yucatán region like Chichén Itzá and Uxmal. Mitla, with Mixtec influence, became the more important site of the Zapotec, overshadowing the waning Monte Albán.  Cholula flourished in central Mexico, as did Tula, the center of Toltec culture.

World population is estimated to have been between c. 250 and 310 million.

Events

Japan
Palace Scandal: Princess Consort Yasuko has an affair. Michinaga (her half-brother) investigates it secretly and finds out the truth about her pregnancy. Yasuko cries and repents. Yasuko leaves the palace under the patronage of Empress Dowager Senshi and Michinaga (moved to his residence).
Murasaki Shikibu starts to write The Tale of Genji.
10 January: Death of Empress Dowager Masako (empress consort of the late Emperor Reizei)
8 April: Fujiwara no Shoshi is promoted to Empress (Chugu), while there is another empress, Fujiwara no Teishi (kogo) - this is the first time that there are two empresses

Americas
  The Taíno have become the dominant culture of modern day Puerto Rico.

Christendom 

 In continental Europe, the Holy Roman Empire established itself as the most powerful state. The Holy Roman Emperor Otto III made a pilgrimage from Rome to Aachen and Gniezno (Gnesen), stopping at Regensburg, Meissen, Magdeburg, and Gniezno. The Congress of Gniezno (with Bolesław I Chrobry) was part of his pilgrimage. In Rome, he built the basilica of San Bartolomeo all'Isola, to host the relics of St. Bartholomew.
 In the Kingdom of France, Robert II, the son of Hugh Capet, was the first King of the Capetian royal dynasty. The Byzantine Empire under the Macedonian dynasty was engaged in a long and hard war with the First Bulgarian Empire. In the year 1000, the Byzantine generals Theodorokanos and Nikephoros Xiphias captured the former Bulgarian capitals of Pliska and Great Preslav, along with Little Preslav, extending Byzantine control over the northeastern portion of the Bulgarian state (Mysia and Scythia Minor). At the same time, Byzantium was instrumental in the Christianization of the Kievan Rus' and of other medieval confederations of Slavic states.
 In Great Britain, a unified Kingdom of England had developed out of the various Anglo-Saxon kingdoms.
 In Scandinavia, Christianization was in its early stages, with the Althingi of the Icelandic Commonwealth embracing Christianity in the year 1000. On September 9,  the King of Norway, Olaf Tryggvason, was defeated by the Scandinavian kingdoms of Denmark and Sweden in the Battle of Svolder. Sweyn I established Danish control over part of Norway. The city of Oslo was founded in Norway (the exact year is debatable, but the 1,000 year anniversary was held in the year 2000). It is known that in or around this year, Norse explorer Leif Erikson became the first European to land in the Americas, at L'Anse aux Meadows in modern-day Newfoundland.
 The papacy during this time was in a period of decline, in retrospect known as the saeculum obscurum ("Dark Age") or "pornocracy" ("rule of harlots"), a state of affairs that would result in the Great Schism between Roman Catholicism and Eastern Orthodoxy later in the 11th century.
 The Kingdom of Hungary was established in 1000 as a Christian state. In the next centuries, the Kingdom of Hungary became the pre-eminent cultural power in the Central European region. On December 25, Stephen I was crowned as the first King of Hungary in Esztergom.
 Sancho III of Navarre became King of Aragon and Navarre. The Reconquista was gaining some ground, but the southern Iberian peninsula would still be dominated by Islam for centuries to come; Córdoba at this time was the world's largest city with 450,000 inhabitants.
 In the Kingdom of Croatia the army of the Republic of Venice lead by Doge Pietro II Orseolo conquered the island of Lastovo.
 The Château de Goulaine vineyard was founded in France. 
 The archdiocese in Gniezno was founded; the first archbishop was Gaudentius (Radim), from Slavník's dynasty, and dioceses in Kołobrzeg, Kraków and Wrocław. 
 The Bell foundry was founded in Italy by Pontificia Fonderia Marinelli.

Islamic world 
The Islamic world was in its Golden Age; still organised in caliphates, it continued to be dominated by the Abbasid Caliphate, with the Caliphate of Córdoba to the west, and experienced ongoing campaigns in Africa and in India. At the time, Persia was in a period of instability, with various polities seceding from  Abbasid rule, among whom the Ghaznavids would emerge as the most powerful.

The Islamic world was reaching the peak of its historical scientific achievements. Important scholars and scientists who flourished in AD 1000 include Abu al-Qasim (Abcasis), Ibn Yunus (publishes his astronomical treatise Al-Zij al-Hakimi al-Kabir in Cairo in c. 1000), Abu Sahl al-Quhi (Kuhi), Abu-Mahmud al-Khujandi, Abu Nasr Mansur, Abu al-Wafa, Ahmad ibn Fadlan, Al-Muqaddasi, Ali Ibn Isa, and al-Karaji (al-Karkhi). Ibn al-Haytham (Book of Optics), Avicenna, Averroes, and Abu Rayhan al-Biruni all flourished around the year 1000.

By this time, the Turkic migration from the Eurasian Steppe had reached Eastern Europe, and most of the Turkic tribes (Khazars, Bulghars, Pechenegs etc.) had been Islamized.

Babylon abandoned 
Babylon was abandoned around this year.

Largest cities 
Córdoba, Caliphate of Córdoba – 450,000
Kaifeng, Song Dynasty (China) – 400,000
Constantinople, Byzantine Empire – 300,000
Angkor, Khmer Empire (Cambodia) – 200,000
Kyoto, Heian Period (Japan) – 175,000
Cairo, Fatimid Caliphate – 135,000
Baghdad, Buyid Dynasty (Iraq) – 125,000
Nishapur, Ghaznavid Dynasty (Iran) – 125,000
Al-Hasa, Qarmatian State (Arabia) – 110,000
Patan, Chaulukya Dynasty (India) – 100,000

Births 
 June 22 – Robert I, duke of Normandy (d. 1035)
 Adalbert, duke of Upper Lorraine (d. 1048)
 Adalbert, archbishop of Hamburg (d. 1072)
 Argyrus, Byzantine general (approximate date)
 Berthold II, duke of Carinthia (approximate date)
 Constantine IX, Byzantine emperor (d. 1055)
 Dominic of Silos, Spanish abbot (d. 1073)
 Egbert, German Benedictine abbot (d. 1058)
 Duthac, patron saint of Tain (Scotland) (d. 1065)
 Gilbert, Norman nobleman (approximate date)
 Guigues I, French nobleman (approximate date)
 Irmgardis, German noblewoman and saint
 John Mauropous, Byzantine hymnographer
 Kyiso, Burmese king of the Pagan Dynasty (d. 1038)
 Liudolf, German nobleman (approximate date)
 Lý Thái Tông, Vietnamese emperor (d. 1054)
 Michael I, Byzantine patriarch (approximate date)
 Mu'ayyad fi'l-Din al-Shirazi, Fatimid scholar (d. 1078)
 Otto Bolesławowic, Polish prince (d. 1033)
 Qawam al-Dawla, Buyid governor (d. 1028)
 Robert de Turlande, French priest (d. 1067)
 Rotho, bishop of Paderborn (approximate date)
 Sylvester III, pope of the Catholic Church (d. 1063)
 Uta von Ballenstedt, margravine of Meissen
 William V, count of Auvergne (d. 1064)
 Yi Yuanji. Chinese painter (approximate date)

Deaths 
 May 17 – Ramwold, German Benedictine monk and abbot
 September 9 – Olaf Tryggvason (or Olaf I), king of Norway
 Abu'l Haret Ahmad, Farighunid ruler (approximate date)
 Abu-Mahmud Khojandi, Persian astronomer and mathematician
 Abū Sahl al-Qūhī, Persian physician, mathematician and astronomer
 Abu Sahl 'Isa ibn Yahya al-Masihi, Persian physician
 Ahmad ibn Fadlan, Arab traveller and writer (approximate date)
 Ælfthryth, English queen and wife of Edgar I (approximate date)
 Barjawan, vizier and regent of the Fatimid Caliphate
 Fantinus (the Younger), Italian hermit and abbot
 García Sáchez II, king of Pamplona (approximate date)
 Gosse Ludigman, governor (potestaat) of Friesland
 Huyan Zan, Chinese general of the Song Dynasty
 Ivar of Waterford, Norse Viking king of Dublin
 Jacob ibn Jau, Andalusian-Jewish silk-manufacturer
 Judah ben David Hayyuj, Moroccan-Jewish linguist
 Malfrida, Russian Grand Princess consort of Kiev
 Manfred I, Frankish nobleman (approximate date)
 Masako, Japanese empress consort (b. 950) 
 Minamoto no Shigeyuki, Japanese waka poet 
 Shahriyar III, Bavand ruler of Tabaristan 
 Tyra of Denmark, queen consort of Norway
 Ukhtanes of Sebastia, Armenian historian

See also

References 

 Robert Lacey and Danny Danziger The Year 1000: What Life Was Like at the Turn of the First Millennium (1999) 
 John Man Atlas of the Year 1000 (1999) 

1000